Burney Island is an island in the Northern Territory, Australia.

References

Islands of the Northern Territory